Bai Dezhang (1931 – 23 November 2019) was a Chinese film actor and director with Changchun Film Studio, best known for his performance in the 1963 film Visitors on the Icy Mountain. He received the Honorary Award of the Golden Phoenix Awards in 2009.

Biography 
Bai was born in 1931 in Xinmin, Liaoning, Republic of China. After the founding of the People's Republic of China in 1949, he became an actor with Northeast Film Studio (a predecessor of Changchun Film Studio).

Starting with bit parts in films such as The White Haired Girl, he later became a principal actor in a number of films such as Ji Hongchang, Eagle in the Storm, and Man in the Painting. His best known role was probably as Commander of the 3rd Platoon in the 1963 film Visitors on the Icy Mountain.

Starting in the 1980s, Bai became a director. Together with his wife Xu Xunxing, also a director at Changchun Film Studio, he co-directed a number of films including A Place Far From the Crowds, Modern Gladiator, Hero of Guandong, and Heroine of Guandong. In 2009, he received the Honorary Award of the Golden Phoenix Awards.

Bai died on 23 November 2019 in Changchun, aged 88.

References 

1931 births
2019 deaths
20th-century Chinese male actors
Male actors from Liaoning
Film directors from Liaoning
Male actors from Shenyang